Bio-Attack (バイォ・ア夕ツク) is a vertically scrolling shooter arcade game released by Taito in 1983. The player controls a miniaturized ship moving through a human's body while shooting viruses. It was licensed by Fox Video Games, as it is based on the 20th Century Fox film Fantastic Voyage.

Reception 
In Japan, Game Machine listed Bio-Attack on their June 1, 1983 issue as being the seventeenth most-successful table arcade unit of the month.

References

1983 video games
Arcade video games
Vertically scrolling shooters
Video games based on films
Taito arcade games
Taito SJ System games